Martha Louise Munger Black OBE (February 24, 1866 – October 31, 1957) was a Canadian politician. Black was the second woman elected to the House of Commons of Canada.

Biography
Martha was born in on February 24, 1866 in Chicago, Illinois to George and Susan Munger. Of the five children her mother had over four years, Martha was the only one to survive. She was followed by two younger siblings, George Jr. and Belle. Her father lost his laundry business in the Great Chicago Fire, but started over with great success, affording Black a comfortable, upper-class childhood. She was educated at Saint Mary's College in Indiana, a school operated by the Sisters of the Holy Cross.

Martha married Will Purdy in 1887. Together the couple raised two sons, Warren and Donald. Martha and Will made plans to join the Klondike Gold Rush in 1899, but Will backed out, departing instead for Hawaii. Martha did not join Will in Hawaii, choosing to travel to the Klondike with her brother in 1898.

In 1898 she crossed the Chilkoot Pass into Canada, heading for the gold rush in the Klondike. She travelled with a party funded by her father and led by Captain Edward Spencer. The group, which included her brother George Jr. and cousin Harry Peachy, arrived in Dawson City by boat on August 5. They built a log cabin where she gave birth to her and Will's third son, Lyman, on January 31, 1899.

Martha returned home to Chicago, and returned again to the Klondike in 1900. She earned a living by staking gold mining claims and running a sawmill and a gold ore-crushing plant. In 1904, she married George Black, who later became Commissioner of the Yukon from 1912–1916.

In the 1935 federal election, she was elected for the riding of Yukon as an Independent Conservative taking the place of her ill husband. She was the second woman ever to be elected to the House of Commons of Canada.

She published an autobiography, My Seventy Years, in 1938. This work was subsequently updated and republished in her lifetime as My Ninety Years and later further updated posthumously and republished in 1998 as Martha Black: Her Story from the Dawson Gold Fields to the Halls of Parliament.

Black died October 31, 1957, in Whitehorse, at the age of 91. She was buried in the city's Pioneer Cemetery.

Honours and awards
In 1917, she was made a Fellow of the Royal Geographical Society for her series of lectures on the Yukon that she presented in Great Britain. In 1946, she was made an Officer of Order of the British Empire for her cultural and social contributions to the Yukon.

In 1986 a Canadian Coast Guard high-endurance multi-tasked vessel was given the name "Martha L. Black" in her honour. The vessel sails in the Quebec Region area. In 1997, Canada Post issued a $0.45 stamp in her honour. Mount Martha Black in Yukon bears her name.

Archives 
There is a Martha Black fonds at Library and Archives Canada. Records related to Black are also held in Special Collections & Archives at the University of Waterloo as part of the Martha Louise Black fonds.

References

External links
 
Martha Louise Black at The Canadian Encyclopedia

Members of the House of Commons of Canada from Yukon
Independent Conservative MPs in the Canadian House of Commons
People from Dawson City
Saint Mary's College (Indiana) alumni
Canadian Officers of the Order of the British Empire
Fellows of the Royal Geographical Society
Women members of the House of Commons of Canada
Canadian autobiographers
Writers from Whitehorse
Women in Yukon politics
1866 births
1957 deaths
Persons of National Historic Significance (Canada)
Women autobiographers
Politicians from Chicago
American emigrants to Canada
20th-century Canadian women politicians
20th-century Canadian non-fiction writers